Medley is a surname found among English-speaking people.

People with this surname
Bill Medley (born 1940), one of The Righteous Brothers singing duo
Henry Medley (1687–1747), Governor of Newfoundland
John Medley (1804–1892), first Church of England bishop of Fredericton, New Brunswick, Canada
Les Medley, Tottenham Hotspur F.C. footballer of the early 1950s
Linda Medley, American comic book author and illustrator
Luke Medley, English footballer
Paul Medley, English rugby player
Robert Medley, English artist and educator
Samuel Medley (1738–1799), English Baptist minister and hymn-writer
Samuel Medley (painter) (1769–1857), English painter 
Sue Medley (born 1962), Canadian musician
William Medley (born 1952), American Catholic priest
Nik Caner-Medley (born 1983), American basketball player
Zech Medley (born 2000), English Football player

People with Medley as a given name
John Medley Wood (1827–1915), South African botanist 
Walter Medley Tattersall (1882–1943), British biologist

See also
Medley (disambiguation)